Ifeanyi Mathew (born 20 January 1997) is a Nigerian professional footballer who plays for Norwegian Eliteserien club Lillestrøm.

Career

Club
In July 2016, Mathew signed a four-year contract with Tippeligaen side Lillestrøm.

Career statistics

Club

References

External links
Ifeanyi Matthew at Footballdatabase

1997 births
Living people
Nigerian footballers
Nigerian expatriate footballers
Nigerian expatriate sportspeople in Norway
Expatriate footballers in Norway
Nigerian expatriate sportspeople in Turkey
Expatriate footballers in Turkey
Lillestrøm SK players
Ankaraspor footballers
Eliteserien players
Süper Lig players
Association football midfielders
Sportspeople from Kano
Nigeria A' international footballers
2016 African Nations Championship players